Lysa Aya Trenier, also known simply as Aya, is a British singer-songwriter and actress. She most notably is associated with the Naked Music recording label. She is of Singaporean/Irish/Scottish descent.

After growing up in London, she moved to New York City at the age of 18 to focus on her growth as an artist. There she collaborated with Lenny Kravitz, The Pharcyde and Stuart Matthewman. Aya was signed to the Naked Music label after meeting and collaborating with Jay Denes (the mastermind behind Blue Six, and co-founder of Naked Music). Her debut album Strange Flower, a mixture of soul, pop and electronica, was released 11 May 2004.

Aya was a member of the group Repercussions

Aya also appeared in the 1999 film Loving Jezebel. She was credited as Lysa Aya Trenier.

Discography
Strange Flower (2004)

Collaborations

References

External links 

Lysa Aya Trenier on Myspace

Actresses from London
Actresses from New York City
Downtempo musicians
English dance musicians
English emigrants to the United States
English women pop singers
English film actresses
English house musicians
English people of Singaporean descent
English people of Irish descent
English people of Scottish descent
English songwriters
English soul singers
Living people
Singers from London
Singers from New York City
English women in electronic music
Year of birth missing (living people)
21st-century English women singers
21st-century English singers
Repercussions (band) members
21st-century American women